Efstratios Nikolaidis (born 19 September 1985) is a Greek Paralympic athlete who specializes in shot put. He represented Greece at the Paralympic Games.

Career
Nikolaidis represented Greece at the 2012 Summer Paralympics where he finished in fourth place in the men's shot put F20 event with a personal best of 14.51 metres. He again competed at the 2016 Summer Paralympics where he finished in fourth place in the men's shot put F20 event with a personal best of 15.69 metres. He competed in the shot put F20 event at the 2020 Summer Paralympics and won a bronze medal with a distance of 15.93 metres.

References

1985 births
Living people
Athletes from Thessaloniki
Paralympic athletes of Greece
Greek male shot putters
Medalists at the World Para Athletics European Championships
Medalists at the World Para Athletics Championships
Athletes (track and field) at the 2012 Summer Paralympics
Athletes (track and field) at the 2016 Summer Paralympics
Athletes (track and field) at the 2020 Summer Paralympics
Medalists at the 2020 Summer Paralympics
Paralympic medalists in athletics (track and field)
Paralympic bronze medalists for Greece
21st-century Greek people